is a Japanese former figure skater. She is the 2011 Gardena Spring Trophy silver medalist.

Programs

Competitive highlights

References

External links 

 

Japanese female single skaters
1993 births
Living people
People from Ichinomiya, Aichi
Sportspeople from Aichi Prefecture